Złotki may refer to:

Złotki, Węgrów County
Kolonia Złotki
Szlasy-Złotki
Złotki-Pułapki
Złotki-Przeczki
Złotki-Starowieś